Table tennis at the 2021 Summer Deaflympics  was held in Caxias Do Sul, Brazil from 5 to 10 May 2022.

Medal summary

Medalists

References

External links
 Deaflympics 2021

2021 Summer Deaflympics
2022 in table tennis
Table tennis competitions in Brazil